The 1990 Australian Indoor Championships was a men's tennis tournament played on indoor hard courts at the Sydney Entertainment Centre in Sydney in Australia and was part of the Championship Series of the 1990 ATP Tour. It was the 18th edition of the tournament and was held from 1 through 7 October 1990. Second-seeded Boris Becker won the singles title, his second at the event after 1986.

Finals

Singles

 Boris Becker defeated  Stefan Edberg 7–6, 6–4, 6–4
 It was Becker's 5th title of the year and the 38th of his career.

Doubles

 Broderick Dyke /  Peter Lundgren defeated  Stefan Edberg /  Ivan Lendl 6–2, 6–4
 It was Dyke's only title of the year and the 8th of his career. It was Lundgren's only title of the year and the 6th of his career.

References

External links
 International Tennis Federation (ITF) – tournament edition details

 
Australian Indoor Tennis Championships
Ind
October 1990 sports events in Australia
Sports competitions in Sydney
Tennis in New South Wales